Ectobius vittiventris, the amber wood cockroach, is a species belongs to the order Blattodea. It is a species of wood cockroach originally from southern Europe. It is completely harmless to humans and does not appear as a storage pest, as it only feeds on decomposing plant material and perishes within a few days in human dwellings due to a lack of food. Its original range is south of the Alps, but this species seems to have established itself permanently north of the Alps and in southern Germany.

Since the amber forest cockroach is capable of flight, it accidentally finds its way into human dwellings, especially in areas close to its natural habitat. It is attracted by artificial light sources.

Features
The amber forest cockroach is a slender cockroach. The light brown body of the adult animal measuring between 9 to 14 mm long, the antennae are about twice as long as the body. The legs are noticeably thorny. The pronotum has a uniform light brown color and is translucent at the edge. In both sexes, the wings protrude above the tip of the abdomen, they are sometimes finely dotted.

Normally the species can be distinguished from similar species in Central Europe by the uniformly pale, translucent pronotum. In case of doubt, further characteristics are to be used for a reliable determination. Their affiliation to the genus Ectobius can be seen in the thorns on the underside of the middle and rear thighs of the legs; these do not have rows of thorns, but only one or two thorns. The shape of the stylus (an attachment at the tip of the abdomen) and the shape of a glandular field on the upper side of the abdomen in the male are to be used for a reliable identification of the species.  The ootheca of the female is 2.9 to 4.9 millimeters long and slightly curved lengthways. The dividing lines of the egg chambers shine through as fine transverse lines. The surface is sculptured with fine longitudinal ribs.

The natural habitat of the amber forest cockroach is outdoors in low bushes and in gardens under pots. It feeds on decomposing plant material. Warm, dry summers can encourage mass reproduction. Then the probability is high that the animals can also be found in apartments.

In size, shape and color, the amber forest cockroach is very similar to the German cockroach Blattella germanica, which is feared as a hygiene pest and is usually controlled. The most striking difference is the uniform brown pronotum in the amber forest cockroach, which in the German cockroach has two dark longitudinal stripes. While the German cockroach is usually only active at night, hiding during the day and flees from light, the amber forest cockroach is also diurnal. The adults of the amber forest cockroach are relatively capable of flight, while the adults of the German cockroach cannot fly either.

Spread
The amber wood cockroach is naturally widespread in southern Europe (Mediterranean region), north to south of the Alps. Since around 1999 the species has spread northwards. The first finds came from northern Switzerland (e.g. Zurich, Winterthur). It has been proven in Germany (Baden-Württemberg) since 2002.  In 2006 Thuringia was reached, in 2011 the first record was made for Bavaria and Rhineland-Palatinate.  Since 2015 it has been proven for North Rhine-Westphalia.  Since 2018, it has been observed increasingly in Viennese gardens and garden apartments.

References

Cockroaches
Insects described in 1847